The 2011 Australian Goldfields Open was a professional ranking snooker tournament that took place between 18 and 24 July 2011 at the Bendigo Stadium in Bendigo, Australia.

The event was last held in 1995 under the name Australian Masters, where Anthony Hamilton defeated Chris Small 8–6 in the final. However, Hamilton withdrew from the tournament in the qualifying rounds citing personal reasons and therefore did not compete to defend his title.

Stuart Bingham won the first ranking title of his career by defeating Mark Williams 9–8 in the final.

Prize fund
The breakdown of prize money for this year is shown below:

Winner: $60,000
Runner-up: $30,000
Semi-final: $20,000
Quarter-final: $15,000
Last 16: $10,000
Last 32: $7,500
Last 48: $2,000

Stage one highest break: $500
Stage two highest break: $2,500
Total: $425,000

Main draw

Final

Qualifying
These matches took place between 26 and 30 June 2011 at the World Snooker Academy in Sheffield, England. David Gilbert was the only player to go through all four rounds of qualifying to make it to the main stage.

Preliminary round
Best of 9 frames

Round 1–4

Century breaks

Qualifying stage centuries

 141, 101  Ian McCulloch
 137, 111  Barry Hawkins
 137  Liu Chuang
 136, 111, 100  Robin Hull
 136  Mark Davis
 134  Dominic Dale
 126  Mark Joyce
 125  Barry Pinches
 123  Ben Woollaston
 122, 113  David Gilbert
 122  Adrian Gunnell
 118  Aditya Mehta

 117  Jack Lisowski
 115  Liam Highfield
 115  Michael Holt
 114, 100  Matthew Selt
 114  Passakorn Suwannawat
 114  Stuart Bingham
 113, 110, 107, 104  Tian Pengfei
 112  Kurt Maflin
 110  Ben Woollaston
 104  Jamie Burnett
 103  Michael White
 100  Liang Wenbo

Televised stage centuries
 
 142, 140, 118, 110, 106  Mark Williams
 139, 118, 114, 112, 107  Stuart Bingham
 137  Matthew Selt
 134  Ali Carter
 124, 104  Ding Junhui
 123  Dominic Dale
 120, 111  Liang Wenbo
 120  Stephen Hendry
 111, 101  Neil Robertson
 102  Jamie Cope
 101, 100  Mark Allen
 100  Rory McLeod

Notes

 All prize money were subject to 46% local tax.
 Originally Matthew Selt was set to play Steve Mifsud in  the wildcard round, but after the withdrawal of Ronnie O'Sullivan for medical reasons Selt advanced to the last 32 to play John Higgins and Mifsud played against Dominic Dale.
 Originally David Gilbert was set to play James Mifsud in  the wildcard round, but after the withdrawal of Graeme Dott, their match was moved in the last 32 stage of the draw.

References

Australian Goldfields Open
Australian Goldfields Open
Goldfields Open
Sport in Bendigo